MV Empire MacAlpine was a grain ship converted to become the first Merchant Aircraft Carrier (MAC ship).

The Burntisland Shipbuilding Company, Fife, Scotland, built her under order from the Ministry of War Transport and was delivered on 14 April 1943. As a MAC ship, only her air crew and the necessary maintenance staff were naval personnel. She was operated by William Thomson & Co (the Ben Line).

After the war she was converted to a grain carrier. She was scrapped in Hong Kong in 1970.

References

World War II aircraft carriers of the United Kingdom
Bulk carriers
Grain ships
Empire MacAlpine
Empire ships
1942 ships